Adem Dursun (born December 26, 1979) is a retired Turkish footballer. He formerly played for Kayseri Erciyesspor in the TFF First League as a central defender.

References

External links
 Coach profile af TFF

1979 births
Living people
People from Yıldızeli
Turkish footballers
Turkey B international footballers
Turkey under-21 international footballers
Turkey youth international footballers
MKE Ankaragücü footballers
Beşiktaş J.K. footballers
Gaziantepspor footballers
Gençlerbirliği S.K. footballers
Kayseri Erciyesspor footballers
Süper Lig players
Association football defenders